(Holy Mary, mother of God), K. 273, is an act of Consecration to Blessed Virgin Mary in F major, written by Wolfgang Amadeus Mozart for SATB choir, first and second violins, violas and basso continuo of violoncello, double bass and organ. Mozart entered the work into his catalogue on 9 September 1777 in Salzburg.

History
In the summer of 1777, the 21-year-old Mozart was desperate to leave Salzburg, and so asked Archbishop Colloredo to allow him and his father, Leopold, to find their income elsewhere. The archbishop's response was to dismiss both of them from his service, however he later felt remorse, and allowed Leopold to resume his job of deputy Kapellmeister. Mozart composed this act of consecration for the feast of the Nativity of the Blessed Virgin Mary (8 September), before setting out on 23 September 1777 with his mother on their journey to Augsburg, Mannheim, and Paris, where she died.

Text
The text with English translation is as follows:

The full title of the manuscripts and published scores are "Sancta Maria mottetto de B.V.M." or "Graduale ad festum b. M. v. : "Sancta Maria, mater Dei"" (that is: Motet of/for the Blessed Virgin Mary, or Gradual for the Festival of the Blessed Virgin Mary.) The title of the first (known?) (1804, Anton Böhm ) published edition was "Sancta Maria, mater Dei : motette zu Marienfesten für Chor, 2 Violinen, Viola, Kontrabass und Orgel.". Additionally, according to Neue Mozart-Archiv, the autograph and parts-copies have "offertorium" written (but not in Mozart's or any identified hand).

References

External links

Sancta Maria, mater Dei, Latin and English, San Francisco Bach Choir
, Vienna Boys' Choir, men's choir of the Vienna State Opera

Compositions by Wolfgang Amadeus Mozart
1777 compositions
Compositions in F major
18th-century hymns in Latin